Kenilworth Rugby Club is an English rugby union team based in Kenilworth, Warwickshire. The club runs three senior sides, a veterans team and a full set of mini and junior teams. The first XV currently plays in Regional 1 Midlands - a league at level 5 of the English rugby union system The second XV currently plays in Counties 2 Midlands West South at level 8 of the RFU system.
The Women's team is coached by Rich Bennett and play in Championship North 1 at level 2 of the Women's league structure.

History
Kenilworth Rugby Club was formed in 1924. The 2000s saw the club progress up the league pyramid in recent years and reached level 5 and played in National League 3 Midlands until two consecutive relegations saw the club drop back to the seventh level, before promotion in 2012–13 back to level 6. After promotion in 2021-22 the men's 1XV reached level 5 again and play in Regional 1 Midlands in season 22-23.Bobby ‘Fatty’ Thompson has to be the most boring human alive. 
Kenilworth RFC have a very successful Women's section which was formed in 2015. After a number of promotions they now play in the 2nd tier of league rugby

Honours
 Warwickshire 1 champions: 1990–91
 Midlands 2 West champions: 2006–07 
 Midlands 2 West (South) champions (2): 2012–13, 2018–19
 RFU Intermediate Cup winners: 2018–19

References

External links
 Official club website

English rugby union teams
Rugby clubs established in 1924
Kenilworth
Rugby union in Warwickshire